Randy Wayne Frederick (born August 7, 1981) is an American actor.

Life and career
Wayne was born and raised in Moore, Oklahoma. He attended Moore High School and Campbellsville University.

He appeared on the 2002 season of the British reality show Shipwrecked, which led to guest appearances on the television shows The Closer, Huff, NCIS, Jack & Bobby, and Numbers as well as a series regular role as the not-so-bright teenager Jeff Fenton on the 2006 ABC sitcom Sons & Daughters. In 2006, Wayne starred as Robbie Zirpollo in the movie The Surfer King.

He is most famous for his portrayal of Luke Duke in the movie The Dukes of Hazzard: The Beginning. Since then he has starred in numerous independent features including the gay-themed drama Dream Boy, Grizzly Park, and Foreign Exchange. He also portrayed Michael in The Haunting of Molly Hartley, The Last Hurrah, and Ghost Town (a 2009 Syfy Channel horror film, not to be confused with the 2008 Ricky Gervais film of the same name). He starred in the lead role of Jake Taylor in To Save a Life, which was released to theaters on January 22, 2010. Wayne also starred as Duffy in the movie Frat Party.

He starred opposite Matthew Modine in the 20th Century Fox movie, The Trial, released in 2010. His latest appearance was on Talent, a web series from the producers of Pretty Little Liars, as Gabe on www.thetalentshow.com. He also guest starred on The Secret Life of the American Teenager as Frank for four episodes. Wayne also appeared on The Lying Game as Justin Miller, a boy that Laurel was seriously dating but broke up with because he was using Laurel to get revenge on her father, Ted, a surgeon who operated on his mother that died on the operating table.

In 2011, Wayne starred as Dick in the movie Cougar Hunting. He also starred in the 2011 movie Honey 2 co-starring Katerina Graham. In 2011 he played a side character named 'Matt' in HBO's True Blood for two episodes. In 2012, Wayne starred as a young skater named Caleb in the movie Hardflip. He also starred as Johnny in the horror film Hold Your Breath co-starring Katrina Bowden. Wayne had a role as Luke in the movie Heart of the Country. In 2013, he starred as Cyrus Rothwell in the crime film The Freemason. In 2014, Wayne had roles in movies Android Cop, where he played role of Android Cop and Mantervention.

In 2015, Wayne starred as Mike in the horror film Paranormal Island co-starring Briana Evigan. He also starred as Joel Gilbert in the family friendly film The Ivy League Farmer. In 2016, Wayne starred as Collin Jenkins in the thriller film Cassidy Way co-starring Christopher Rich. He starred as Thomas J. Ryan in the history drama film Union Bound. He had supporting roles as Graham in the romantic comedy Accidentally Engaged and as Oliver in thriller The Last Bid. In 2017, he starred as Johnny Taylor in the thriller film Death Pool. That year, he also starred as Jeff in the horror movie Escape Room. He also had a supporting role as Scott Schaeffer in the Hallmark Christmas movie Enchanted Christmas.

Wayne had a recurring role as Matthew Johnson in the season 3 of the web series The Bay. He also had a supporting role as Detective Jake Dark in the film Paint It Red. He starred as Stephen in the short film It Happened Again Last Night alongside Gabrielle Stone. Wayne had a supporting role as Detective Jacobs in the film Cops and Robbers. In 2018, Wayne played the role of David Carter in the direct-to-video horror film Hellraiser: Judgment.

Personal life
Wayne confirmed via his Twitter account that he voted for Donald Trump during the 2020 United States presidential election.

Filmography

Film

Television

Web

References

External links

1981 births
Living people
People from Moore, Oklahoma
Male actors from Oklahoma
American male film actors
American male television actors
Campbellsville University alumni